Cychropsis tryznai is a species of ground beetle in the subfamily of Carabinae. It was described by Haeckel & Sehnal in 2007.

References

tryznai
Beetles described in 2007